The 1992 Hall of Fame Bowl featured the 16th-ranked Syracuse Orangemen, and the 25th-ranked Ohio State Buckeyes. It was the sixth edition to the Hall of Fame Bowl.

Syracuse scored first on a 50-yard touchdown pass from Marvin Graves to Shelby Hill for a 7–0 lead. Graves ran three yards for a touchdown as Syracuse led 14–0 after the first quarter. In the second quarter, Ohio State's Williams kicked a 34-yard field goal.

In the third quarter, Biskup kicked a 32-yard field goal to give Syracuse a 17–3 lead. Ohio State's Carlos Snow ran two yards for a touchdown to cut the lead to 17–10. In the fourth quarter, Ohio State recovered a blocked punt in the end zone for a touchdown to tie it at 17. Syracuse scored the gamewinning touchdown on a 60-yard bomb from Marvin Graves to Antonio Johnson. Syracuse won the game by a 24–17 margin.

References

Hall of Fame Bowl
ReliaQuest Bowl
Ohio State Buckeyes football bowl games
Syracuse Orange football bowl games
Hall of Fame Bowl
20th century in Tampa, Florida
Hall of Fame Bowl